Brucepattersonius iheringi, also known as Ihering's akodont, Ihering's hocicudo, or Ihering's brucie, is a South American rodent in the genus Brucepattersonius. It occurs in Santa Catarina and Rio Grande do Sul, southern Brazil, and nearby Misiones Province, Argentina.

References

Literature cited
Christoff, A., Leite, Y. and Patterson, B. 2008. . In IUCN. IUCN Red List of Threatened Species. Version 2009.2. <www.iucnredlist.org>. Downloaded on February 4, 2010.
Duff, A. and Lawson, A. 2004. Mammals of the World: A checklist. New Haven, Connecticut: Yale University Press, 312 pp. 
Musser, G.G. and Carleton, M.D. 2005. Superfamily Muroidea. Pp. 894–1531 in Wilson, D.E. and Reeder, D.M. (eds.). Mammal Species of the World: a taxonomic and geographic reference. 3rd ed. Baltimore: The Johns Hopkins University Press, 2 vols., 2142 pp. 

Brucepattersonius
Mammals of Brazil
Mammals described in 1896
Taxa named by Oldfield Thomas